The President of the Victorian Legislative Council, also known as the presiding officer of the council, is the presiding officer of the Victorian Legislative Council, the upper house of the Parliament of Victoria and equivalent to the President of the Australian Senate.  When there is a vacancy in the office of president, a new president is elected by the members of the council from among its number. The president ceases to hold that office if they cease to be a member of the council, and can be removed at any time by a vote of the members. The current president is Shaun Leane.

The role of the president
The president is always a member of the Victorian Legislative Council, and is the ceremonial head of that council.  The president performs ceremonial duties, and represents the council to other organisations.  In conjunction with the Speaker of the Victorian Legislative Assembly, the president is responsible for the administration of the Victorian Parliament.  When the council is sitting, the president enforces procedures and assists the smooth running of council meetings. The president is assisted in their duties by a deputy president.

Choosing the president
The president of the Legislative Council is an elected position.  When a new president is required, any member of the Legislative Council may propose, during a council sitting, any other present member for the position of president.  If more than one member is proposed and seconded, all members must agree to one particular candidate. After election, the president presents his or herself as the choice of the council to be their president.

List of presidents of the Legislative Council
Note: where no political party is listed, this means that either the party is unknown, or that the President in question was not affiliated with any particular party.  Multiple parties are listed in cases where the President represented more than one party over his career as a Member of the Legislative Council.

References

Victoria